Hohenwestedt (Low Saxon: Wiste') is a municipality in the district of Rendsburg-Eckernförde, in Schleswig-Holstein, Germany. It is situated approximately 23 km south of Rendsburg, 25 km west of Neumünster and 40 km southwest of Kiel.

It has a population of about 5,000 and a size of 18.18 squarekilometer. Since January 2012 it is part of the Amt Mittelholstein, of which it is the seat.

The town's landmark is the Peter-Pauls Church, the biggest church in town.

Hohenwestedt's twin towns are Müncheberg, Germany, and Billund, Denmark.

Transportation

The town lies on the Neumünster-Heide railway and offers connections to Neumünster and Heide.

References

Rendsburg-Eckernförde